Mile Perković (11 September 1920 – 2 October 2013) was a notable Yugoslav Partisan, Economist and sports administrator. He was FK Sarajevo president of the assembly when the club won its first Yugoslav First League title in 1967.

References

1920 births
2013 deaths
FK Sarajevo presidents of the assembly
University of Sarajevo alumni